"Typisk norsk" is a song by Norwegian singer Katastrofe featuring violinist Alexander Rybak. It was released on 27 November 2015 as a digital download in Norway through PBK Entertainment and Sony Music Entertainment Norway. The song peaked at number 12 on the Norwegian Singles Chart, making it Rybak's first single to chart in Norway since "Roll with the Wind" in 2010.

Music video
A music video to accompany the release of "Typisk norsk" was first released onto YouTube on 6 December 2015 at a total length of two minutes and forty-eight seconds.

Track listing

Chart performance

Weekly charts

Release history

References

2015 songs
2015 singles
Songs written by Alexander Rybak